Louisa Lane Drew (January 10, 1820 – August 31, 1897) was an English-born American actress and theatre owner and an ancestor of the Barrymore acting family. Professionally she was often known as Mrs. John Drew.

Life and career

Louisa Lane was born in London, England, the daughter of Eliza Trentner (1796–1887), a singer and actress, and Thomas Frederick Lane (1796–1825), an actor and theatre manager. Louisa and her mother came to America when she was six years old. She proved to be a child prodigy playing five different adult roles within one play at the age of eight in 1828. As a young woman and strolling player, her theatrical travels took her, her mother and half sisters as far away as Jamaica, by sailing ship, where one of her step fathers died. She returned to the United States in 1847 to support Junius Brutus Booth. She appeared in several plays with both him and his son, John Wilkes Booth.

She and her third husband John Drew were the parents of Louisa Drew (Mendum) (1851–1888), John Drew, Jr. and Georgie Drew (Barrymore). She had no known children from her first two marriages. The Drews owned the Arch Street Theatre, where they staged performances, and she managed the business. The Arch Street was a competitor theatre of the still standing Walnut Street Theatre. After her husband's death Mrs Drew adopted a baby boy and named him Sidney.  She was the grandmother through Georgie of John Barrymore, Ethel Barrymore and Lionel Barrymore. Her other grandchildren were Georgie Drew Mendum, Edmund Mendum, Louise Drew, and S. Rankin Drew. She is the great-great-grandmother of Drew Barrymore.

In May 1895 the aged Mrs Drew appeared in an all-star revival of Sheridan's The Rivals. In 1897 an ailing Louisa Drew spent her last summer at her annual Larchmont, New York retreat with her grandsons Lionel and John Barrymore.

Death
She died on August 31, 1897 at the age of 77 and her body was initially interred at Glenwood Cemetery and eventually moved to Mount Vernon Cemetery.

The historic Arch Street Theatre was demolished in 1936.

References

External links

 

1820 births
1897 deaths
British emigrants to the United States
Louisa Lane Drew
Burials at Glenwood Cemetery/Glenwood Memorial Gardens
Burials at Mount Vernon Cemetery (Philadelphia)
19th-century English actresses
English stage actresses
19th-century American actresses
American stage actresses
19th-century theatre managers
19th-century American businesswomen
19th-century American businesspeople